is a passenger railway station  located in the city of Yonago, Tottori Prefecture, Japan. It is operated by the West Japan Railway Company (JR West).

Lines
The distance between stations to the next station, Bakurōmachi Station, is officially 0.5 km in rail kilometers, but the actual distance (actual km) is about 420 meters, which is the shortest distance between stations on all JR lines.

Station layout
There is no station building and the station is unattended.

History
Fujimichō Station opened on 1 November 1987.

Passenger statistics
In fiscal 2018, the station was used by an average of 306 passengers daily.

Surrounding area
 West Japan Railway Company Gotō Factory
 Route 9
 Route 181
 Route 183
 Route 482
 Broadcasting System of San-in

See also
List of railway stations in Japan

References

External links 

  Fujimichō Station from JR-Odekake.net 

Railway stations in Japan opened in 1987
Railway stations in Tottori Prefecture
Stations of West Japan Railway Company
Yonago, Tottori